Abubakar Alhaji is a Nigerian administrator who is a former Minister of Planning and Finance. He currently holds the title of Sardauna of Sokoto. Alhaji was a long serving Permanent Secretary who worked with various Nigerian administrations.

Early life and education
Alhaji was born to the family of Muhammed Sani also known as Alhaji Alhaji because he was born on the day of Sallah and went on a made pilgrimage to Mecca, he was also called Dogon Daji, Sarkin Shanu. Alhaji attended a secondary school in Kano before transferring to Katsina Government College. He later attended Bournemouth College of Commerce and University of Reading, Berkshire earning a degree in political economy. Alhaji took courses at the Hague Institute of Social Services and the IMF Institute, Washington.

Career 
He joined the Nigerian civil service in 1964 and was an Assistant Secretary in the Federal Ministry of Finance in the late 1960s. After attending a course in The Hague, he was briefly posted to the Ministry of Industries where he became a Principal Assistant Secretary. In 1971, he was posted back to the Ministry of Finance. In 1975, he became a Permanent Secretary in the Federal Ministry of Trade and was in the ministry till 1978. In 1979, he was posted to the Finance Ministry as the Permanent Secretary. In his role at the Finance Ministry, he was involved in managing Nigeria's relationship with its external creditors and was on the Nigerian negotiating team for Lome II agreement. Alhaji was later posted to the Ministry of Planning before Babangida upgraded his position as Minister of State, Budget and Planning in 1988. Between 1990 and 1991, he was the Minister of Finance. In the mid-1990s, he was the country's High Commissioner to United Kingdom.

Alhaji was turbaned Sardauna in 1990, the previous title holder, Ahmadu Bello died in 1966. He is a senior brother to the late Aliyu Dasuki who was raised by Ibrahim Dasuki. He has a grandson, Ibraheem Dasuki Aminu-Alhaji.

References

Year of birth missing (living people)
Living people
Finance ministers of Nigeria
Nigerian diplomats
Hausa people